The following lists events that happened during 1854 in Chile.

Incumbents
President of Chile: Manuel Montt

Events

April
April - The Chile 1854 Census is conducted.

Births 
9 September - Nicolás Palacios (d. 1911)

Deaths
22 November - José Joaquín Prieto (b. 1786)

References 

1850s in Chile
Chile
Chile